The Klosterbjerge are a mountain range in East Greenland. It is located in Nathorst Land, at the southern end of the Northeast Greenland National Park.

Highest point
The  highest peak of the range is one of the ultra-prominent summits of Greenland. It was first ascended in 1977 by a German expedition led by Karl Maria Herrligkoffer.

See also
List of mountain ranges of Greenland

References

Mountain ranges of Greenland